The Funeral Games of Patroclus is a 1778 oil-on-canvas painting by the French artist Jacques-Louis David. It shows the funeral games for Patroclus during Trojan War, with his body and Achilles at the foot of the pyre and Hector resting on his chariot on the right. It was first exhibited at the Palazzo Mancini in Rome in September 1778, where it was a critical success. It was then lost until 1972, when it was acquired by the National Gallery of Ireland, its present home.

References

Bibliography
 Régis Michel et Marie-Catherine Sahut, David, l'art et le politique, Paris, Gallimard, coll. « Découvertes Gallimard » (n° 46), 1988, p.s 12, 21, 23

External links
Preparatory drawing (1774) - Louvre

1778 paintings
Mythological paintings by Jacques-Louis David
Collection of the National Gallery of Ireland
Horses in art
Ships in art
Paintings based on the Iliad